Anatoly Voronovsky (born 28 December 1966, Baku) is a Russian political figure and a deputy of the 8th State Duma.
 
After graduating from the Azerbaijan Higher Naval Academy, Voronovsky served at the Northern Fleet. In 1998 he started working at the  department of internal security and the fight against corruption of the Office of the Federal Tax Police Service of the Russian Federation for the Murmansk Oblast. From 2002 to 2005, he was the Head of the Department for Civil Defense and Emergencies, Cossacks and Economic Affairs of the Administration of the Ust-Labinsky District of the Krasnodar Krai. In 2005, he became the Head of the Ust-Labinsk administration. In 2008, he became the Head of the Starominsky District. In 2015, he was appointed first Deputy Head, and later, the Head of the Department of Transport of the Krasnodar Krai. A year later, Voronovsky became the Minister of Transport and Road Facilities of the Krasnodar Krai. From 2017 to 2020, he was the Deputy Governor of the Krasnodar Krai. In 2020-2021, he worked as an Advisor to the Governor of the Krasnodar Krai Veniamin Kondratyev.  Since September 2021, he has served as deputy of the 8th State Duma.

References
 

 

1966 births
Living people
United Russia politicians
21st-century Russian politicians
Eighth convocation members of the State Duma (Russian Federation)